JFC Kauguri is a Latvian football club located in Jūrmala.

Current squad

Kauguri Jurmala
Kauguri Jurmala